Fishless cycling is a form of "maturing" an aquarium. In this process, ammonia is provided to allow beneficial bacteria to colonize. Fishless cycling can reduce the chance of fish loss resulting from insufficient populations of these bacteria.

Process 

Fishless cycling takes place over a period of several weeks, during which the aquarist provides an ammonia source for the development of the nitrifying bacterial colony. Nitrifying bacteria in the aquarium grow on all surfaces, but particularly in areas of high water flow and high surface area such as the filter. Allowing ammonia to be converted to nitrite, and on to the less harmful nitrate, minimizes stress and injury to aquarium fish. The "nitrogen cycle" may take several weeks to complete, but may be quicker under certain conditions. Higher water temperatures, greater dissolved oxygen and bacterial seeding from an established tank may cut down the time required to less than a week.

Advantages 
The most significant advantage of fishless cycling is that it can reduce fish loss due to ammonia and nitrite spikes. Fish loss can be very discouraging for beginners of fish keeping, so indirectly, fishless cycling can also help beginners get a good start.

Cycling aquariums using feeder fish is risky, because it infects the aquarium with any disease or parasite they happen to have. Fish raised as feeders do not get the same degree of care as non-feeders. Fishless cycling avoids this potential problem.

Fishless cycling also allows the aquarium to be partially stocked from the moment it is cycled, if the nitrogen cycle is completed with high concentration of pure ammonia added daily. This means that for large aquariums, where fish must be added in several batches, fishless cycling is faster than cycling with fish. It can also be extremely useful when the fish keeper plan to stock a tank full of territorial aggressive fish, such as African cichlids, where the later added fish can be at a disadvantage.  However, care in adding ammonia for fishless cycling must be used, too high of an ammonium concentration can kill the helpful bacteria.

Disadvantages 
Phosphates are often created as byproducts when decaying fish food is the source of ammonia.
There might not be enough ammonia to allow a sufficient population of bacteria to colonize when fish food is the source of ammonia.

These are not problems when ammonium hydroxide or ammonium chloride is used as the source of ammonia.
It might cost more than other methods to cycle the tank, if you include all the cost of the water test kit, pure ammonia, etc.
Pure ammonia cycling is not as quick nor does it allow as higher bio-load stocking of the aged filter media method.

See also 
Fishkeeping
Nitrogen cycle

Notes 
 

Aquariums